Mathew Allan Leckie (born 4 February 1991) is an Australian soccer player who plays for Melbourne City FC in the A-League and the Australian national team (for whom he has previously been the captain). Leckie, being a quick and agile player, is usually placed on the wing. However, he has previously been deployed as a midfielder, striker/second striker and even as a wing-back.

Club career

Early life
As a child growing up in Melbourne's Western Suburbs, Leckie actually aspired to play Australian rules football, his family supporting Essendon and Box Hill, however at 11 years old a change to a school in Sunshine North with a more multicultural student body and close friends inspired him to take up football and he "never looked back".

Leckie was a member of Victorian State League Division 1 outfit, Bulleen Lions until 2 September 2009, where Leckie was signed to Adelaide United for a two-year professional contract.

Adelaide United
He made his A-League debut on 18 September for Adelaide United coming on as a substitute in the 75th minute against Melbourne Victory.

Leckie scored the winning goal in his first AFC Champions League match on 24 February 2010, against the reigning champions Pohang Steelers at Hindmarsh Stadium. He followed this up by scoring his second goal in as many games against Shandong Luneng in Adelaide's 2–0 win on Match Day 2 of the Champions League. Leckie is considered to be one of Australia's best young players.

Leckie started the 2010–11 season with a bang, scoring twice in Adelaide's first five games, earning wide praise for his entertaining and robust style of play and winning the favour of the Australian U19 side for their competing in the 2010 AFC Under-19 championships.

Borussia Mönchengladbach
At the end of the A-League season he signed for German side Borussia Mönchengladbach. He scored his first goals for his new club with a double in a 5–2 friendly win against Aberdeen on 9 July 2011. In early 2013, he was loaned out to Frankfurt and has since scored 3 goals in only 2 appearances for the reserve team.

FSV Frankfurt
On 3 June 2013, Leckie made his loan move to FSV Frankfurt permanent, signing a three-year contract that would run until 2016. Leckie stated the move was made to maximise his personal development and to build on the successes of his first season spent at FSV on loan where he made 28 appearances and scored 4 goals.

FC Ingolstadt 04
On 7 May 2014, he signed a three-year contract with FC Ingolstadt 04. While playing for Ingolstadt, the club was promoted to the Bundesliga at the end of the 2014–15 season. In the 2015–16 Bundesliga season Leckie scored a goal against FC Augsburg, which was one of three goals he scored that season and one of the season's best goals.

Hertha BSC

On 22 May 2017, it was announced that Leckie had signed for Hertha BSC for the 2017–18 season. He began his spell positively, appearing in many pre-season matches and assisting two goals in his first competitive appearance for the club in the first round of the DFB Pokal against Hansa Rostock. Leckie scored two goals on his debut for Hertha BSC on matchday one of the 2017–18 Bundesliga season against VfB Stuttgart in a 2–0 home victory. After the game Leckie said: "It's probably one of the best weeks of my life, so I'm definitely a happy guy at the moment."

Leckie scored his first European goal in a 3–2 away defeat to Athletic Bilbao in the 2017–18 Europa League on 23 November 2017.

Since the 2019–20 season, Leckie has played a combined total of thirteen matches in all competitions for Hertha (excluding his one appearance for Hertha BSC II in Regionalliga Nordost []), compared to his forty-eight in the previous two. Leckie has also scored zero goals in the latter two seasons and eight in the former. It was reported in early 2020 that Leckie wanted to leave Hertha BSC, with Leckie stating: "[I'll] do everything I can to leave," adding that "I wanted to leave [before this season] and I had the feeling a lot would change." In May 2020, Leckie decided to stay with Hertha BSC for another season when he stated on the Fox Football Podcast, "...so for family reasons I decided to stay here for another season."

Melbourne City FC

On 5 June 2021, it was announced that Leckie had signed a three year deal to join Melbourne City FC.

International career
In August 2009, Leckie was selected to represent Australia in the AFF U19 Youth Championship 2009, where he opened up the score-sheet in the 4–1 win over hosts, Vietnam, in the semi-finals.
Mathew was called up to the Australian Under-19s for the 2010 AFC U-19 Championship.

Ex-Australian National Coach, Pim Verbeek, named Leckie in the 25 man Socceroos squad for the AFC Asian Cup 2011 Qualifier against Indonesia. Leckie didn't make an appearance in the game which Australia won 1–0 to book their place in the Asian Cup.

Ex-Australian national coach Holger Osieck included Leckie in the squad for the international friendly against the Republic of Korea on 14 November 2012. Leckie came on as a late substitution with only limited time on the ball.

Australian National Coach, Ange Postecoglou, included Leckie in the squad for the international friendly against Costa Rica on 19 November 2013.

2014 World Cup
Leckie had an outstanding World Cup campaign resulting in pundits estimating his worth at $10 million. He was quoted saying he does not regret his decision to sign for German second division club FC Ingolstadt, recognising that he may have had offers from larger clubs following his World Cup performances.
"So whether I could have maybe had other offers now after this World Cup if I hadn't signed, I never would have known."

2015 Asian Cup
Leckie was named as part of Australia's 2015 AFC Asian Cup squad. He started Australia's first game of the tournament against Kuwait, hitting the crossbar in the second half, and then providing the assist for James Troisi to score Australia's fourth goal of the match and helping Australia to a 4–1 win.

2017 Confederations Cup
Leckie took part in Australia's hopes of success in the 2017 Confederations Cup after the squad was announced in May 2017. He started the first two group matches and came on as a Substitute in the last group match in the 57th minute against Chile.

2018 World Cup qualification
On 3 September 2015, Leckie scored his second goal for Australia, and his first since 2013, opening the scoring against Bangladesh in a 2018 FIFA World Cup qualifier. On 5 September 2017, Leckie scored his 6th international goal for Australia against Thailand.

In May 2018, he was named in Australia's 23-man squad for the 2018 FIFA World Cup in Russia.

Captaincy
In May 2021, he was named the new captain of the Socceroos, replacing the retired Mark Milligan. Later in 2021 Leckie withdrew indefinitely from the national team, due to hotel quarantine requirements imposed on overseas travelers due to the COVID-19 pandemic.

2022 World Cup
In November 2022, Leckie was included in the squad for the 2022 World Cup. In the third and final crucial group game against Denmark, he scored the winner in a 1–0 victory that ensured qualification to the round of 16.

Career statistics

Club

International
Statistics accurate as of match played 30 November 2022.

Honours
Club
Ingolstadt 04
 2. Bundesliga: 2014–15

Melbourne City
 A-League: 2020–21, 2021–22

International
Australia U19
 AFF U19 Youth Championship: 2010
 AFC U19 Championship runner-up: 2010

Australia
 AFC Asian Cup: 2015

Individual
 Adelaide United Rising Star: 2009–10
A-Leagues All Star: 2022

References

External links

1991 births
Australian people of Scottish descent
Australia international soccer players
A-League Men players
Adelaide United FC players
Borussia Mönchengladbach players
Borussia Mönchengladbach II players
FSV Frankfurt players
FC Ingolstadt 04 players
Hertha BSC players
Melbourne City FC players
Bundesliga players
2. Bundesliga players
2014 FIFA World Cup players
2015 AFC Asian Cup players
2017 FIFA Confederations Cup players
2018 FIFA World Cup players
Australian expatriate soccer players
Expatriate footballers in Germany
Australian expatriate sportspeople in Germany
Soccer players from Melbourne
Living people
AFC Asian Cup-winning players
Association football wingers
Association football forwards
2019 AFC Asian Cup players
Australian soccer players
2022 FIFA World Cup players